Viet Nguyen is a retired American soccer player who spent his entire professional career with the Seattle Sounders in the USL First Division. As of January 2019, Nguyen is the youth director for Pacific Northwest Soccer Club.

Nguyen attended the University of Louisville, playing on the men's soccer team in 1994 and 1995 and again in 1997 and 1998.  He played sixty-nine games, scoring fifteen goals and adding eleven assists, during his four-year collegiate career.  He graduated with a bachelor's degree in sociology. In 1995, Nguyen played for the United States men's national under-20 soccer team which failed to qualify for the World Youth Championships.  In 1999, the Seattle Sounders selected Nguyen in the territorial round of the A-League draft.  Nguyen spent six seasons with the Sounders before retiring and entering the coaching ranks.

In 2011, he came out of retirement to play for the Tacoma Stars of the Professional Arena Soccer League.

References

External links
 '95 Blue – Viet Nguyen

Living people
1976 births
American soccer coaches
American soccer players
Seattle Sounders (1994–2008) players
USL First Division players
Washington Huskies men's soccer players
Soccer players from Washington (state)
United States men's under-20 international soccer players
Association football forwards
Tacoma Stars (2003–) players
Professional Arena Soccer League players